The rowing competitions at the 2018 Mediterranean Games took place between 28 and 30 June at the Canal Olímpic de Catalunya in Castelldefels. 

Athletes competed in 6 events.

Medal summary

Men's events

Women's events

Medal table

References

External links
2018 Mediterranean Games – Rowing

Sports at the 2018 Mediterranean Games
2018
Mediterranean Games